Gene "Bingo" O Driscoll was a Gaelic footballer who played with Annascaul and the Kerry county team during the late 1980s and 1990s he also played for the New York county team.

Personal life-
O Driscoll's relatives Gene and brother Johnny also played for Kerry.

Honours
Inter-county
 All Ireland U21 Championship 1: 1990
 Munster U21 Championship 1: 1990
 Munster Junior Championship 1991
 All Ireland Junior Championship 1991
 Munster Senior Championship 1: 1996

Club
 Kerry Senior Football Championship 1: 1990
 Kerry Intermediate Football Championship 3: 1987, 1992, 2007
 County League Div 1 1: 1991
 Munster Intermediate Club Football Championship 1: 2007
 West Kerry Senior Championship 4: 1988, 1989, 1990, 1992
 New York Senior Football Championship 5: 1999, 2004, 2005, 2006, 2008

References

 https://web.archive.org/web/20090619122113/http://munster.gaa.ie/winning-teams/u21f_teams/
 http://munster.gaa.ie/winning-teams/sf_teams/
 https://web.archive.org/web/20091219221445/http://munster.gaa.ie/winning-teams/ifclub_teams/

Year of birth missing (living people)
Living people
Annascaul Gaelic footballers
Kerry inter-county Gaelic footballers
Kerry New York Gaelic footballers
New York inter-county Gaelic footballers